Zack Bialobos (born June 9, 1996) is an American socialite, DJ, record executive and club promoter. He initially rose to prominence in the Los Angeles nightlife scene in the late 2010s as a party promoter and DJ. As a music executive, he joined James Canton's Field Trip Recordings in 2018 as co-founder and signed notable artists such as Yeat, SSGKobe, and Slump6s.

Early life
Zack Bialobos was born on June 9, 1996, in New York City. His parents split when he was 9, and he was raised by his mother as a result. Bia's mother would expose him to music and magazine culture at a young age.  Inspired by this, Bia would make money by downloading music on people's iPods when he was 8 or 9.

Career

2015–2017: Club promotion and DJing
On Bia's 19th birthday, while attending the University of Southern California, he visited a Los Angeles nightclub for the first time. Rapper Fetty Wap was also there, and he invited Bia and his friends to party with them. Following the party, a promoter asked for Bia's number, assuming he was a member of Fetty Wap's entourage. After bringing college classmates to parties he attended, he was getting paid $100 to promote the club once a week. Eventually he was discovered by John Terzian, founder of the H.Wood Group, and worked alongside him. After hosting and DJing parties and dinners at the nightclub Delilah, Bia befriended musician Drake in 2017. He then cameoed in Drake's music video for "Money in the Grave", which garnered speculation as to who he was.

2018–present: Recording label and signings
In 2018, Bia joined on record executive James Canton's record label Field Trip Recordings as a co-founder. He has since signed rappers Yeat, SSGKobe, Slump6s, HVN and OnlyBino, and singers Mallory Merk and Max Drazen, all of whom are in jointly signed with major record labels.

On January 27, 2023, Bia released the single "Hardcore" (feat. Don Toliver).

On February 22, 2023, he released "One Of Those Days" (feat. Lil Yachty and 347aidan).

Field Trip Recordings

Field Trip Recordings, LLC is an American record label originally founded on April 25, 2017 in Los Angeles by American record executive James Canton, with Zack Bia later joining on as a co-founder in 2018. The label commenced operations in 2020.

The label has signed rappers Yeat, SSGKobe, Slump6s, HVN and OnlyBino, as well as singers Mallory Merk and Max Drazen, all of whom are joint-ventures with the label among various major record labels.

Roster

References

1996 births
Living people
DJs from Los Angeles
American music industry executives
People from Beverly Hills, California
Beverly Hills High School alumni